Merouane Zerrouki (born January 25, 2001, in Kouba, Algeria) is an Algerian professional footballer who plays as a forward for Paradou AC in the Algerian Ligue Professionnelle 1.

Zerrouki made his Algerian league debut on September 24, 2019, coming on as a substitute in the 1–0 win over ASO Chlef.

Honours
Algeria
FIFA Arab Cup: 2021

References

External links
 

Living people
2001 births
People from Kouba
Footballers from Algiers
Algerian footballers
Association football forwards
Algeria youth international footballers
Algerian Ligue Professionnelle 1 players
21st-century Algerian people